Trailer Park Boys: The Animated Series is a Canadian adult animated television series created by John Paul Tremblay, Robb Wells, and Mike Smith. The series is a spin-off and sequel to the 2001 television mockumentary comedy series, Trailer Park Boys, itself a sequel to Mike Clattenburg's 1999 film of the same name.

Picking up after the events of the original series' twelfth season, The Animated Series continues to follow the misadventures of a group of trailer park residents, some of whom are ex-convicts, living in the fictional Sunnyvale Trailer Park in Dartmouth, Nova Scotia.

The series premiered on Netflix on March 31, 2019. A second season was released on May 22, 2020.

Cast and characters

Main
 John Paul Tremblay as Julian
 Robb Wells as Ricky LaFleur
 Mike Smith as Bubbles "Bubs"

Recurring cast
 John Dunsworth (archive recording) as Jim Lahey 
 Patrick Roach as Randy
 Cory Bowles as Himself / Steve French / Naked Man
 Jeanna Harrison as Trinity LaFleur-Collins 
 Jacob Rolfe as Jacob Collins
 Sarah Dunsworth-Nickerson as  Sarah
 Tyrone Parsons as Himself
 Marguerite McNeil as Marguerite Murphy
 Shelley Thompson as Barb Lahey (season 1)

Notable special guests
 Nathan MacKinnon as himself (season 1)
 Alex Lifeson as Big Chunk (season 1)
 Josh Homme as himself (season 1)
 Kevin O’Leary as himself (season 1)
 Mark Cuban as himself (season 1)
 Arlene Dickinson as herself (season 1)
 Michael Wekerle as himself (season 1)
 Jay Baruchel as Jason Rucknel (season 1 & 2)
 Edge as Sledge (season 2)

Production

Casting
John Dunsworth (Jim Lahey) posthumously appears in the series. John Dunsworth's daughter Sarah Dunsworth-Nickerson (who plays a character with the same first name), tweeted that her father's real voice was used in the animated series.

Episodes

Series overview

Season 1 (2019)

Season 2 (2020)

Reception
Rudi Abdullah of Cultured Vultures gave the first  season a positive review. He said: "Trailer Park Boys: The Animated Series utilizes its cartoon format in a handful of successful ways but it doesn't manage to hold a candle to its live action predecessor."

References

External links
 
 
 

2010s Canadian adult animated television series
2010s Canadian animated comedy television series
2010s Canadian sitcoms
2020s Canadian adult animated television series
2020s Canadian animated comedy television series
2020s Canadian sitcoms
2019 Canadian television series debuts
2020 Canadian television series endings
Canadian adult animated comedy television series
Canadian animated sitcoms
Canadian animated television spin-offs
English-language Netflix original programming
Animated television series by Netflix
Trailer Park Boys